In New Zealand, Crown Research Institutes (CRIs) are corporatised Crown entities charged with conducting scientific research.

Crown Research Institutes date from 1992, with most formed out of parts of the former Department of Scientific and Industrial Research (DSIR) and of elements of various government departments. The dissolution of the DSIR, along with the government-imposed requirement that the CRIs become "financially viable" and operate on commercial lines, created a certain amount of resentment among some scientists.

The Crown Research Institutes Act 1992 states the purpose of a CRI as carrying out research, and that each CRI must do this for the benefit of New Zealand, pursuing excellence in all that it does, abiding by ethical standards and recognising social responsibility; and operating as a good employer. A CRI must do these things whilst remaining financially viable.  The technical definition of financial viability changes from time to time, but  focused on return on equity.  The State does not expect CRIs to maximise profit, but simply to cover the costs of capital. This formula aims to ensure appropriate commercial disciplines whilst fulfilling scientific purposes.

The State charges CRIs with promoting the transfer and dissemination of research, science and technology. In other words, they have the role of "making a difference" with the research they produce. They do this via strategic, long-term relationships with sectors (the CRI Act set up most of the CRIs with a sector-orientation), to support, sustain, challenge and develop existing sectors and also to lead development of new sectors.

Governance and administration 

The New Zealand Government — via two Cabinet Ministers (the Minister of Research, Science and Technology and the Minister of Finance) — holds all shares in each of the  eight CRIs.  Cabinet appoints a Board for each CRI.  Each Board — intended to comprise business, "professional" and science expertise — operates according to the Companies Act as well as the CRI Act (1992) and other relevant Acts. Each Board produces an annual report and reports to the Crown Company Monitoring Advisory Unit (CCMAU), (part of The Treasury), which represents the shareholders.  Parliament also scrutinises each CRI on a regular basis.

Day-to-day, however, CRIs operate as any commercial company would, acting within their strategic statement of intent (agreed with the shareholders) that aligns with the CRI Act purpose and principles.

The CRIs, along with Callaghan Innovation, cooperate as Science New Zealand.

Funding 

NSOF (the Non-Specific Output Fund) provided CRIs with some independent public-good research-funding streams from 1992 to 2005. The CRI Capability Fund (CF) replaced NSOF as from 1 July 2005. It provided public funding to maintain, enhance, and foster current or new capabilities. In 2010, the Government provided each CRI with core funding to deliver outcomes for the benefit of New Zealand. Core funding gives CRIs greater financial certainty and comprises a significant proportion of total funding available to CRIs.

List of CRIs 

 CRIs:

 New Zealand Pastoral Agriculture Research Institute (AgResearch)
 New Zealand Institute for Plant and Food Research (Plant & Food Research)
 Institute of Environmental Science and Research (ESR)
 Scion (New Zealand Forest Research Institute Limited)
 GNS Science, the Institute of Geological and Nuclear Sciences
 Landcare Research (Landcare Research)
 National Institute of Water and Atmospheric Research (NIWA)

The New Zealand Institute for Plant and Food Research Limited (trading as Plant & Food Research) formed by combining the Crop & Food Research and HortResearch on 1 December 2008 

Another CRI, the Institute For Social Research and Development, was disestablished in 1995 after failing to achieve financial viability. It should not be confused with the UN agency of the same name.

Industrial Research Limited (IRL) merged into a new Crown entity, Callaghan Innovation, on 1 February 2013.

See also 
 Kiwi Advanced Research and Education Network
 ARENA

References

External links 

 Science New Zealand

Crown Research Institutes of New Zealand